The Picture of Dorian Gray is a philosophical novel by Irish writer Oscar Wilde. A shorter novella-length version was published in the July 1890 issue of the American periodical Lippincott's Monthly Magazine. The novel-length version was published in April 1891.

The story revolves around a portrait of Dorian Gray painted by Basil Hallward, a friend of Dorian's and an artist infatuated with Dorian's beauty. Through Basil, Dorian meets Lord Henry Wotton and is soon enthralled by the aristocrat's hedonistic worldview: that beauty and sensual fulfillment are the only things worth pursuing in life. Newly understanding that his beauty will fade, Dorian expresses the desire to sell his soul, to ensure that the picture, rather than he, will age and fade. The wish is granted, and Dorian pursues a libertine life of varied amoral experiences while staying young and beautiful; all the while, his portrait ages and visually records every one of Dorian's sins.

Wilde's only novel, it was subject to much controversy and criticism in its time but has come to be recognized as a classic of gothic literature.

Origins

In 1889, J. M. Stoddart, an editor for Lippincott's Monthly Magazine, was in London to solicit novellas to publish in the magazine. On 30 August 1889, Stoddart dined with Oscar Wilde, Sir Arthur Conan Doyle and T. P. Gill at the Langham Hotel, and commissioned novellas from each writer. Doyle promptly submitted The Sign of the Four, which was published in the February 1890 edition of Lippincott's, but Stoddart did not receive Wilde's manuscript for The Picture of Dorian Gray until 7 April 1890, seven months after having commissioned the novel from him.

In July 1889, Wilde published "The Portrait of Mr. W. H.", a very different story but one that has a similar title to The Picture of Dorian Gray and has been described as "a preliminary sketch of some of its major themes", including homosexuality.

Publication and versions

1890 novella 
The literary merits of The Picture of Dorian Gray impressed Stoddart, but he told the publisher, George Lippincott, "in its present condition there are a number of things an innocent woman would make an exception to." Fearing that the story was indecent, Stoddart deleted around five hundred words without Wilde's knowledge prior to publication. Among the pre-publication deletions were: (i) passages alluding to homosexuality and to homosexual desire; (ii) all references to the fictional book title Le Secret de Raoul and its author, Catulle Sarrazin; and (iii) all "mistress" references to Gray's lovers, Sibyl Vane and Hetty Merton.

It was published in full as the first 100 pages in both the American and British editions of the July 1890 issue, first printed on 20 June 1890. Later in the year the text was distributed by Ward, Lock and Company.

1891 novel 

For the fuller 1891 novel, Wilde retained Stoddart's edits and made some of his own, while expanding the text from thirteen to twenty chapters and added the book's famous preface. Chapters 3, 5, and 15–18 are new, and chapter 13 of the magazine edition was divided into chapters 19 and 20 for the novel. Revisions include changes in character dialogue as well as the addition of the preface, more scenes and chapters, and Sibyl Vane's brother, James Vane.

The edits have been construed as having been done in response to criticism, but Wilde denied this in his 1895 trials, only ceding that critic Walter Pater, whom Wilde respected, did write several letters to him "and in consequence of what he said I did modify one passage" that was "liable to misconstruction". A number of edits involved obscuring homoerotic references, to simplify the moral message of the story. In the magazine edition (1890), Basil tells Lord Henry how he "worships" Dorian, and begs him not to "take away the one person that makes my life absolutely lovely to me." In the magazine edition, Basil focuses upon love, whereas, in the book edition (1891), he focuses upon his art, saying to Lord Henry, "the one person who gives my art whatever charm it may possess: my life as an artist depends on him."

Wilde's textual additions were about the "fleshing out of Dorian as a character" and providing details of his ancestry that made his "psychological collapse more prolonged and more convincing." The introduction of the James Vane character to the story develops the socio-economic background of the Sibyl Vane character, thus emphasising Dorian's selfishness and foreshadowing James's accurate perception of the essentially immoral character of Dorian Gray; thus, he correctly deduced Dorian's dishonourable intent towards Sibyl. The sub-plot about James Vane's dislike of Dorian gives the novel a Victorian tinge of class struggle. With such textual changes, Oscar Wilde meant to diminish the moralistic controversy about the novel The Picture of Dorian Gray.

In April 1891, the publishing firm of Ward, Lock and Company, who had distributed the shorter, more inflammatory, magazine version in England the previous year, published the revised version of The Picture of Dorian Gray. In the decade after Wilde's death, the authorized edition of the novel was published by Charles Carrington, who specialized in literary erotica.

2011 "uncensored" novella 
The original typescript submitted to Lippincott's Monthly Magazine, housed at UCLA, had been largely forgotten outside of professional Wilde scholars until the 2011 publication of The Picture of Dorian Gray: An Annotated, Uncensored Edition by the Belknap Press. This includes the roughly 500 words of text deleted by J. M. Stoddart, the story's initial editor, prior to its publication in Lippincott's in 1890. For instance, in one scene, Basil Hallward confesses to have worshipped Dorian Gray with a "romance of feeling", and that he had never loved a woman.

Preface 
Following the criticism of the magazine edition of the novel, the 1891 publication of The Picture of Dorian Gray included a preface in which Wilde addressed the criticisms and defended the reputation of his novel. The content, style, and presentation of the preface made it famous in its own right as a literary and artistic manifesto in support of artists' rights and art for art's sake.

To communicate how the novel should be read, Wilde used aphorisms to explain the role of the artist in society, the purpose of art, and the value of beauty. It traces Wilde's cultural exposure to Taoism and to the philosophy of Chuang Tsǔ (Zhuang Zhou). Before writing the preface, Wilde had written a book review of Herbert Giles's translation of the work of Zhuang Zhou, and in the essay The Artist as Critic, Oscar Wilde said:

The preface was first published in the April 1891 edition of the novel; nonetheless, by June 1891, Wilde was defending The Picture of Dorian Gray against accusations that it was a bad book.

Summary

On a beautiful summer day in Victorian England, Lord Henry Wotton, an opinionated man, is observing the sensitive artist Basil Hallward painting the portrait of Dorian Gray, a handsome young man who is Basil's ultimate muse. While sitting for the painting, Dorian listens to Lord Henry espousing his hedonistic world view and begins to think that beauty is the only aspect of life worth pursuing, prompting Dorian to wish that his portrait would age instead of himself.

Under Lord Henry's hedonistic influence, Dorian fully explores his sensuality. He discovers the actress Sibyl Vane, who performs Shakespeare plays in a dingy, working-class theatre. Dorian approaches and courts her, and soon proposes marriage. The enamoured Sibyl calls him "Prince Charming", and swoons with the happiness of being loved, but her protective brother, James, warns that if "Prince Charming" harms her, he will murder him.

Dorian invites Basil and Lord Henry to see Sibyl perform in Romeo and Juliet. Sibyl, too enamoured with Dorian to act, performs poorly, which makes both Basil and Lord Henry think Dorian has fallen in love with Sibyl because of her beauty instead of her acting talent. Embarrassed, Dorian rejects Sibyl, telling her that acting was her beauty; without that, she no longer interests him. On returning home, Dorian notices that the portrait has changed; his wish has come true, and the man in the portrait bears a subtle sneer of cruelty.

Conscience-stricken and lonely, Dorian decides to reconcile with Sibyl, but he is too late, as Lord Henry informs him that Sibyl has killed herself. Dorian then understands that, where his life is headed, lust and beauty shall suffice. Dorian locks the portrait up, and over the following eighteen years, he experiments with every vice, influenced by a morally poisonous French novel that Lord Henry Wotton gave him.

One night, before leaving for Paris, Basil goes to Dorian's house to ask him about rumours of his self-indulgent sensualism. Dorian does not deny his debauchery, and takes Basil to see the portrait. The portrait has become so hideous that Basil is only able to identify it as his by the signature he affixes to all of his portraits. Basil is horrified, and beseeches Dorian to pray for salvation. In anger, Dorian blames his fate on Basil and stabs him to death. Dorian then calmly blackmails an old friend, the scientist Alan Campbell, into using his knowledge of chemistry to destroy the body of Basil Hallward. Alan later kills himself.

To escape the guilt of his crime, Dorian goes to an opium den, where, unbeknownst to Dorian, James Vane is present. James had been seeking vengeance upon Dorian ever since Sibyl killed herself, but had no leads to pursue as the only thing he knew about Dorian was the name Sibyl called him, "Prince Charming". In the opium den, however, he hears someone refer to Dorian as "Prince Charming", and he accosts Dorian. Dorian deceives James into believing that he is too young to have known Sibyl, who killed herself eighteen years earlier, as his face is still that of a young man. James relents and releases Dorian, but is then approached by a woman from the opium den who reproaches James for not killing Dorian. She confirms that the man was Dorian Gray and explains that he has not aged in eighteen years. James runs after Dorian, but he has gone.

James then begins to stalk Dorian, causing Dorian to fear for his life. However, during a shooting party, a hunter accidentally kills James Vane, who was lurking in a thicket. On returning to London, Dorian tells Lord Henry that he will live righteously from now on. His new probity begins with deliberately not breaking the heart of the naïve Hetty Merton, his current romantic interest. Dorian wonders if his newly-found goodness has rescinded the corruption in the picture but when he looks at it, he sees only an even uglier image of himself. From that, Dorian understands that his true motives for the self-sacrifice of moral reformation were the vanity and curiosity of his quest for new experiences, along with the desire to restore beauty to the picture.

Deciding that only full confession will absolve him of wrongdoing, Dorian decides to destroy the last vestige of his conscience and the only piece of evidence remaining of his crimes: the picture. In a rage, he takes the knife with which he murdered Basil Hallward and stabs the picture. The servants of the house awaken on hearing a cry from the locked room; on the street, a passerby who also heard the cry calls the police. On entering the locked room, the servants find an unknown old man stabbed in the heart, his figure withered and decrepit. The servants are able to identify the disfigured corpse as Dorian only by the rings on the fingers, while the portrait beside him is beautiful again.

Characters

Dorian Gray – a handsome, narcissistic young man enthralled by Lord Henry's "new" hedonism. He indulges in every pleasure and virtually every 'sin', studying its effect upon him.
 Basil Hallward – a deeply moral man, the painter of the portrait, and infatuated with Dorian, whose patronage realises his potential as an artist. The picture of Dorian Gray is Basil's masterpiece.
 Lord Henry "Harry" Wotton – an imperious aristocrat and a decadent dandy who espouses a philosophy of self-indulgent hedonism. Initially Basil's friend, he neglects him for Dorian's beauty. The character of witty Lord Harry is a critique of Victorian culture at the Fin de siècle – of Britain at the end of the 19th century. Lord Harry's libertine world view corrupts Dorian, who then successfully emulates him. To the aristocrat Harry, the observant artist Basil says, "You never say a moral thing, and you never do a wrong thing."  Lord Henry takes pleasure in impressing, influencing, and even misleading his acquaintances (to which purpose he bends his considerable wit and eloquence) but appears not to observe his own hedonistic advice, preferring to study himself with scientific detachment.  His distinguishing feature is total indifference to the consequences of his actions.
 Sibyl Vane – a talented actress and singer, she is a beautiful girl from a poor family with whom Dorian falls in love. Her love for Dorian ruins her acting ability, because she no longer finds pleasure in portraying fictional love as she is now experiencing real love in her life. She commits suicide with poison on learning that Dorian no longer loves her; at that, Lord Henry likens her to Ophelia, in Hamlet.
 James Vane – Sibyl's younger brother, a sailor who leaves for Australia. He is very protective of his sister, especially as their mother cares only for Dorian's money. Believing that Dorian means to harm Sibyl, James hesitates to leave, and promises vengeance upon Dorian if any harm befalls her. After Sibyl's suicide, James becomes obsessed with killing Dorian, and stalks him, but a hunter accidentally kills James. The brother's pursuit of vengeance upon the lover (Dorian Gray), for the death of the sister (Sibyl) parallels that of Laertes' vengeance against Prince Hamlet.
 Alan Campbell – chemist and one-time friend of Dorian who ended their friendship when Dorian's libertine reputation devalued such a friendship. Dorian blackmails Alan into destroying the body of the murdered Basil Hallward; Campbell later shoots himself dead.
 Lord Fermor – Lord Henry's uncle, who tells his nephew, Lord Henry Wotton, about the family lineage of Dorian Gray.
 Adrian Singleton – A youthful friend of Dorian's, whom he evidently introduced to opium addiction, which induced him to forge a cheque and made him a total outcast from his family and social set.
 Victoria, Lady Henry Wotton – Lord Henry's wife, whom he treats disdainfully; she later divorces him.

Influences and allusions

Wilde's own life 
Wilde wrote in an 1894 letter:

Hallward is supposed to have been formed after painter Charles Haslewood Shannon. Scholars generally accept that Lord Henry is partly inspired by Wilde's friend Lord Ronald Gower. It was purported that Wilde's inspiration for Dorian Gray was the poet John Gray, but Gray distanced himself from the rumour. Some believe that Wilde used Robert de Montesquiou in creating Dorian Gray.

Faust
Wilde is purported to have said, "in every first novel the hero is the author as Christ or Faust." In both the legend of Faust and in The Picture of Dorian Gray a temptation (ageless beauty) is placed before the protagonist, which he indulges. In each story, the protagonist entices a beautiful woman to love him, and then destroys her life. In the preface to the novel, Wilde said that the notion behind the tale is "old in the history of literature", but was a thematic subject to which he had "given a new form".

Unlike the academic Faust, the gentleman Dorian makes no deal with the Devil, who is represented by the cynical hedonist Lord Henry, who presents the temptation that will corrupt the virtue and innocence that Dorian possesses at the start of the story. Throughout, Lord Henry appears unaware of the effect of his actions upon the young man; and so frivolously advises Dorian, that "the only way to get rid of a temptation is to yield to it. Resist it, and your soul grows sick with longing." As such, the devilish Lord Henry is "leading Dorian into an unholy pact, by manipulating his innocence and insecurity."

Shakespeare
In the preface, Wilde speaks of the sub-human Caliban character from The Tempest. In chapter seven, he writes: "He felt as if he had come to look for Miranda and had been met by Caliban".

When Dorian tells Lord Henry about his new love Sibyl Vane, he mentions the Shakespeare plays in which she has acted, and refers to her by the name of the heroine of each play. Later, Dorian speaks of his life by quoting Hamlet, a privileged character who impels his potential suitor (Ophelia) to suicide, and prompts her brother (Laertes) to swear mortal revenge.

Joris-Karl Huysmans
The anonymous "poisonous French novel" that leads Dorian to his fall is a thematic variant of À rebours (1884), by Joris-Karl Huysmans. In the biography Oscar Wilde (1989), the literary critic Richard Ellmann said: Wilde does not name the book, but at his trial he conceded that it was, or almost [was], Huysmans's À rebours ... to a correspondent, he wrote that he had played a "fantastic variation" upon À rebours, and someday must write it down. The references in Dorian Gray to specific chapters are deliberately inaccurate.

Possible Disraeli influence

Some commentators have suggested that The Picture of Dorian Gray was influenced by the British Prime Minister Benjamin Disraeli's (anonymously published) first novel Vivian Grey (1826) as, "a kind of homage from one outsider to another." The name of Dorian Gray's love interest, Sibyl Vane, may be a modified fusion of the title of Disraeli's best known novel (Sybil) and Vivian Grey's love interest Violet Fane, who, like Sibyl Vane, dies tragically. There is also a scene in Vivian Grey in which the eyes in the portrait of a "beautiful being" move when its subject dies.

 Reactions 

 Contemporary response 
Even after the removal of controversial text, The Picture of Dorian Gray offended the moral sensibilities of British book reviewers, to the extent, in some cases, of saying that Wilde merited prosecution for violating the laws guarding public morality.

In the 30 June 1890 issue of the Daily Chronicle, the book critic said that Wilde's novel contains "one element ... which will taint every young mind that comes in contact with it." In the 5 July 1890 issue of the Scots Observer, a reviewer asked "Why must Oscar Wilde 'go grubbing in muck-heaps?'" The book critic of The Irish Times said, The Picture of Dorian Gray was "first published to some scandal." Such book reviews achieved for the novel a "certain notoriety for being 'mawkish and nauseous', 'unclean', 'effeminate' and 'contaminating'." Such moralistic scandal arose from the novel's homoeroticism, which offended the sensibilities (social, literary, and aesthetic) of Victorian book critics. Most of the criticism was, however, personal, attacking Wilde for being a hedonist with values that deviated from the conventionally accepted morality of Victorian Britain.

In response to such criticism, Wilde aggressively defended his novel and the sanctity of art in his correspondence with the British press. Wilde also obscured the homoeroticism of the story and expanded the personal background of the characters in the 1891 book edition.

Due to controversy, retailing chain W H Smith, then Britain's largest bookseller, withdrew every copy of the July 1890 issue of Lippincott's Monthly Magazine from its bookstalls in railway stations.

At Wilde's 1895 trials, the book was called a "perverted novel" and passages (from the magazine version) were read during cross-examination. The book's association with Wilde's trials further hurt the book's reputation. In the decade after Wilde's death in 1900, the authorized edition of the novel was published by Charles Carrington, who specialized in literary erotica.

 Modern response 
In a 2009 review, critic Robin McKie considers the novel to be technically mediocre, saying that the conceit of the plot guaranteed its fame, but the device is never pushed to its full. On the other hand, in March 2014, Robert McCrum of The Guardian listed it among the 100 best novels ever written in English, calling it "an arresting, and slightly camp, exercise in late-Victorian gothic".

Legacy and adaptations

Though not initially a widely appreciated component of Wilde's body of work following his death in 1900, The Picture of Dorian Gray has come to attract a great deal of academic and popular interest, and has been the subject of many adaptations to film and stage.

In 1913, it was adapted to the stage by writer G. Constant Lounsbery at London's Vaudeville Theatre. In the same decade, it was the subject of several silent film adaptations. Perhaps the best-known and most critically praised film adaptation is 1945's The Picture of Dorian Gray, which earned an Academy Award for best black-and-white cinematography, as well as a Best Supporting Actress nomination for Angela Lansbury, who played Sibyl Vane.

In 2003, Stuart Townsend played Dorian Gray in the film League of Extraordinary Gentlemen. In 2009, the novel was loosely adapted into the film Dorian Gray, starring Ben Barnes as Dorian and Colin Firth as Lord Henry.

The Dorian Award is named in honor of Wilde, in reference to The Picture of Dorian Gray; the original award was a simple certificate with an image of Wilde along with a graphic of hands holding a black bow tie. The first Dorian Awards were announced in January 2010 (nominees were revealed the previous month).

Bibliography
Editions include:
 The Picture of Dorian Gray (Oxford: Oxford World's Classics, 2008) . Edited with an introduction and notes by Joseph Bristow. Based on the 1891 book edition.
 The Uncensored Picture of Dorian Gray (Belknap Press, 2011) . Edited with an introduction by Nicholas Frankel. This edition presents the uncensored typescript of the 1890 magazine version.
 The Picture of Dorian Gray (New York: Norton Critical Editions, 2006) . Edited with an introduction and notes by Michael Patrick Gillespie. Presents the 1890 magazine edition and the 1891 book edition side by side.
 The Picture of Dorian Gray (Harmondsworth: Penguin Classics, 2006), . Edited with an introduction and notes by Robert Mighall. Included as an appendix is Peter Ackroyd's introduction to the 1986 Penguin Classics edition. It reproduces the 1891 book edition.
 The Picture of Dorian Gray (Broadview Press, 1998) . Edited with an introduction and notes by Norman Page. Based on the 1891 book edition.

See also
 Dorian Gray syndrome
 The Happy Hypocrite – a thematic inversion of The Picture of Dorian Gray''

References

External links

 
 Replica of the 1890 Edition & Critical Edition at University of Victoria
 
 
 
 

 
1890 British novels
1890 fantasy novels
1890s LGBT novels
British Gothic novels
Novels first published in serial form
Victorian novels
Works by Oscar Wilde
Works originally published in Lippincott's Monthly Magazine
Narcissism in fiction
Fiction about suicide
British novels adapted into plays
Irish novels adapted into films
British LGBT novels
Novels adapted into operas
British novels adapted into television shows
Irish novels adapted into plays
LGBT-related horror literature
Obscenity controversies in literature
Novels with gay themes
1890 debut novels
19th-century Irish novels
Novels adapted into comics
British philosophical novels
LGBT-related controversies in literature